Liparis adiastolus is a fish from the genus Liparis. It lives in the Northeastern Pacific Ocean and may be found in shallow water and estuaries. The fish has a pale ring at the base of its caudal fin.

References

Liparis (fish)
Fish described in 2003